Mrs. Soffel is a 1984 American drama film directed by Gillian Armstrong, starring Diane Keaton and Mel Gibson and based on the story of condemned brothers Jack and Ed Biddle, who escaped prison with the aid of the warden's wife, Kate Soffel.

It was filmed on location in and around the Serez family farm in Mulmur, Ontario, as well as Wisconsin (train sequences) and establishing shots in Pittsburgh. The jail sequences were filmed in both the Allegheny County Courthouse and inside and outside of the old Allegheny County Jail for 3 days, and prisoners there were used as extras in the movie. The film was entered in the 35th Berlin International Film Festival.

Plot 
Kate Soffel is the wife of a Pittsburgh prison warden in 1901. They have four children. After several months of being sick in bed for no discernible reason, she suddenly regains her strength. She visits inmates to read Bible scripture to them and meets Ed Biddle and his brother Jack, both of whom may be innocent of the crimes that brought them there.

Mrs. Soffel falls in love with Ed and enables him and Jack to escape, smuggling bar-cutting blades to them at the prison. They go on the run together, with tragic results.

Cast

Reception 
Pauline Kael wrote: 

Roger Ebert only gave the film two stars, calling it "an anemic Bonnie and Clyde" and concluded that the performances were unconvincing. Vincent Canby called it a "very strange and maddening movie", but praised the performances of Keaton and Gibson.

References

External links 
 
 
 
 
 
 

1984 films
1984 drama films
1980s prison films
Romantic period films
Films set in Pittsburgh
Films directed by Gillian Armstrong
American films based on actual events
American prison drama films
Metro-Goldwyn-Mayer films
Films produced by Scott Rudin
Films scored by Mark Isham
1980s English-language films
1980s American films